Hassel may refer to:

Places
Hassel (Bergen), a municipality in the borough of Bergen, Lower Saxony, Germany
Hassel (Weser), a municipality in the district of Nienburg, Lower Saxony, Germany
Hassel, Saxony-Anhalt, a municipality in the district of Stendal, Saxony-Anhalt, Germany
Hassel, Luxembourg, part of the municipality Weiler-la-Tour, Luxembourg
Hassel Island, U.S. Virgin Islands
Lake Hassel, a lake in Minnesota
Hassel Sound
 A river in the Harz

Other
Hassel (surname)
Hassel (TV series), Swedish TV series

See also
Hassell (disambiguation)